Edward Theodore Gein (August 27, 1906 – July 26, 1984), also known as the Butcher of Plainfield or the Plainfield Ghoul, was an American murderer and body snatcher. Gein's crimes, committed around his hometown of Plainfield, Wisconsin, gathered widespread notoriety in 1957 after authorities discovered that he had exhumed corpses from local graveyards and fashioned trophies and keepsakes from their bones and skin. Gein also confessed to killing two women: tavern owner Mary Hogan, in 1954, and hardware store owner Bernice Worden, in 1957.

Gein was initially found unfit to stand trial and confined to a mental health facility. By 1968, he was judged competent to stand trial; he was found guilty of the murder of Worden, but he was found legally insane and was remanded to a psychiatric institution. He died at Mendota Mental Health Institute from respiratory failure resulting from lung cancer, on July 26, 1984, aged 77. He is buried next to his family in the Plainfield Cemetery, in a now-unmarked grave.

Early life

Childhood 
Gein was born in La Crosse, Wisconsin, on August 27, 1906, the second of two boys of George Philip Gein (1873–1940) and Augusta Wilhelmine (née Lehrke) Gein (1878–1945). Gein had an elder brother, Henry George Gein (1901–1944).

Augusta was fervently religious, and nominally Lutheran. She preached to her sons about the innate immorality of the world, the evil of drinking, and her belief that all women (apart from herself) were naturally promiscuous and instruments of the devil. She reserved time every afternoon to read to them from the Bible, usually selecting verses from the Old Testament and the Book of Revelation concerning death, murder and divine retribution. She hated her husband, an alcoholic who was unable to keep a job; he had worked at various times as a carpenter, tanner, and insurance salesman. During his time in La Crosse, George owned a local grocery shop, but he soon sold the business and left the city with his family to live in isolation on a  farm in the town of Plainfield, Wisconsin, which became the Gein family's permanent residence. Augusta took advantage of the farm's isolation by turning away outsiders who could have influenced her sons. Gein left the farm only to attend school. Outside of school, Gein spent most of his time doing chores on the farm.

Gein was shy, and classmates and teachers remembered him as having strange mannerisms, such as seemingly random laughter, as if he were laughing at his own personal jokes. To make matters worse, Augusta punished him whenever he tried to make friends. Despite his poor social development, Gein did fairly well in school, particularly in reading.

Deaths in immediate family 
On April 1, 1940, Ed Gein's father George died of heart failure caused by his alcoholism, at age 66. Henry and Ed began doing odd jobs around town to help cover living expenses. The brothers were generally considered reliable and honest by residents of the community. While both worked as handymen, Ed also frequently babysat for neighbors. He enjoyed babysitting, seeming to relate more easily to children than adults. Henry began dating a divorced mother of two and planned to move in with her; he worried about his brother's attachment to their mother and often spoke ill of her around Ed, who responded with shock and hurt.

On May 16, 1944, Henry and Ed were burning away marsh vegetation on the property; the fire got out of control, drawing the attention of the local fire department. By the end of the day—the fire having been extinguished and the firefighters gone—Ed reported his brother missing. With lanterns and flashlights, a search party searched for Henry, whose dead body was found lying face down. Apparently, he had been dead for some time, and it appeared that the cause of death was heart failure since he had not been burned or injured otherwise.

It was later reported, by biographer Harold Schechter, that Henry had bruises on his head. The police dismissed the possibility of foul play and the county coroner later officially listed asphyxiation as the cause of death. The authorities accepted the accident theory, but no official investigation was conducted and an autopsy was not performed. Questioning Ed Gein about the death of Bernice Worden in 1957, state investigator Joe Wilimovsky brought up questions about Henry's death. George W. Arndt, who studied the case, wrote that, in retrospect, it was "possible and likely" that Henry's death was "the 'Cain and Abel' aspect of this case".

Gein and his mother were now alone. Augusta had a paralyzing stroke shortly after Henry's death, and Gein devoted himself to taking care of her. Sometime in 1945, Gein later recounted, he and his mother visited a man named Smith, who lived nearby, to purchase straw. According to Gein, Augusta witnessed Smith beating a dog. A woman inside the Smith home came outside and yelled for him to stop but Smith beat the dog to death. Augusta was extremely upset by this scene; however, what bothered her did not appear to be the brutality toward the dog but, rather, the presence of the woman. Augusta told Ed that the woman was not married to Smith and so had no business being there, and angrily called her "Smith's harlot". She had a second stroke soon after, and her health deteriorated rapidly. She died on December 29, 1945, at the age of 67. Ed was devastated by her death; in the words of author Harold Schechter, he had "lost his only friend and one true love. And he was absolutely alone in the world."

Work
Gein held on to the farm and earned money from odd jobs. He boarded up rooms used by his mother, including the upstairs, downstairs parlor, and living room, leaving them untouched. While the rest of the house became increasingly squalid, these rooms remained pristine. Gein lived thereafter in a small room next to the kitchen. Around this time, he became interested in reading pulp magazines and adventure stories, particularly those involving cannibals or Nazi atrocities, specifically from Ilse Koch.<ref>The Psycho Records, p.2, by Laurence A. Rickels, 2016</ref>

Gein was a handyman and received a farm subsidy from the federal government starting in 1951. He occasionally worked for the local municipal road crew and crop-threshing crews in the area. Sometime between 1946 and 1956, he also sold an  parcel of land that his brother Henry had owned.

 Crimes 
On the morning of November 16, 1957, Plainfield hardware store owner Bernice Worden disappeared. A Plainfield resident reported that the hardware store's truck had been driven out from the rear of the building at around 9:30a.m. The hardware store saw few customers the entire day; some area residents believed that this was because of deer hunting season. Bernice Worden's son, Deputy Sheriff Frank Worden, entered the store around 5:00p.m. to find the store's cash register open and blood stains on the floor.

Frank Worden told investigators that on the evening before his mother's disappearance, Gein had been in the store, and that he was to have returned the next morning for a gallon of antifreeze. A sales slip for a gallon of antifreeze was the last receipt written by Worden on the morning that she disappeared. On the evening of the same day, Gein was arrested at a West Plainfield grocery store, and the Waushara County Sheriff's Department searched the Gein farm.

A Waushara County Sheriff's deputy discovered Worden's decapitated body in a shed on Gein's property, hung upside down by her legs with a crossbar at her ankles and ropes at her wrists. The torso was "dressed out like a deer". She had been shot with a .22-caliber rifle, and the mutilations were made after her death.

Searching the house, authorities found:

 Whole human bones and fragments
 A wastebasket made of human skin
 Human skin covering several chair seats
 Skulls on his bedposts
 Female skulls, some with the tops sawn off
 Bowls made from human skulls
 A corset made from a female torso skinned from shoulders to waist
 Leggings made from human leg skin
 Masks made from the skin of female heads
 Mary Hogan's face mask in a paper bag
 Mary Hogan's skull in a box
 Bernice Worden's entire head in a burlap sack
 Bernice Worden's heart "in a plastic bag in front of Gein's potbelly stove"
 Nine vulvae in a shoe box
 A young girl's dress and "the vulvas of two females judged to have been about fifteen years old"
 A belt made from female human nipples
 Four noses
 A pair of lips on a window shade drawstring
 A lampshade made from the skin of a human face
 Fingernails from female fingers

These artifacts were photographed at the state crime laboratory and then "decently disposed of".

When questioned, Gein told investigators that between 1947 and 1952, that he made as many as 40 nocturnal visits to three local graveyards to exhume recently buried bodies while he was in a "daze-like" state. On about 30 of those visits, he said that he came out of the daze while in the cemetery, left the grave in good order, and returned home emptyhanded. On the other occasions, he dug up the graves of recently buried middle-aged women he thought resembled his mother and took the bodies home, where he tanned their skins to make his paraphernalia.

Gein admitted to stealing from nine graves from local cemeteries  and led investigators to their locations. Allan Wilimovsky of the state crime laboratory participated in opening three test graves identified by Gein. The caskets were inside wooden boxes; the top boards ran crossways (not lengthwise). Gein had robbed the graves soon after the funerals while the graves were not completed. The test graves were exhumed because authorities were uncertain as to whether the slight Gein was capable of single-handedly digging up a grave during a single evening; they were found as Gein described: two of the exhumed graves were found empty (one had a crowbar in place of the body). One casket was empty; one casket Gein had failed to open when he lost his pry bar, and most of the body was gone from the third grave, yet Gein had returned rings and some body parts. Thus, Gein's confession was largely corroborated.

Soon after his mother's death, Gein began to create a "woman suit" so that "he could become his mother—to literally crawl into her skin". Gein denied having sex with the bodies he exhumed, explaining: "They smelled too bad." During state crime laboratory interrogation, Gein also admitted to shooting Mary Hogan, a tavern owner missing since 1954 whose head was found in his house, but he later denied memory of details of her death.

A 16-year-old youth, whose parents were friends of Gein and who attended ball games and movies with him, reported that Gein kept shrunken heads in his house, which Gein had described as relics from the Philippines, sent by a cousin who had served on the islands during World War II. Upon investigation by the police, these were determined to be human facial skins, carefully peeled from corpses and used by Gein as masks.

Gein was also considered a suspect in several other unsolved cases in Wisconsin, including the 1953 disappearance of Evelyn Hartley, a La Crosse babysitter.

During questioning, Waushara County sheriff Art Schley reportedly assaulted Gein by banging his head and face into a brick wall. As a result, Gein's initial confession was ruled inadmissible. Schley died of heart failure at age 43 in 1968 before Gein's trial. Many who knew Schley said he was traumatized by the horror of Gein's crimes, and this, along with the fear of having to testify (especially about assaulting Gein), caused his death. One of his friends said: "He was a victim of Ed Gein as surely as if he had butchered him."

Trial
On November 21, 1957, Gein was arraigned on one count of first degree murder in Waushara County Court, where he pleaded not guilty by reason of insanity. Gein was diagnosed with schizophrenia and found mentally incompetent, thus unfit for trial. He was sent to the Central State Hospital for the Criminally Insane (now the Dodge Correctional Institution), a maximum-security facility in Waupun, Wisconsin, and later transferred to the Mendota State Hospital in Madison, Wisconsin.

In 1968, doctors determined Gein was "mentally able to confer with counsel and participate in his defense". The trial began on November 7, 1968, and lasted one week. A psychiatrist testified that Gein had told him that he did not know whether the killing of Bernice Worden was intentional or accidental. Gein had told him that while he examined a gun in Worden's store, the gun went off, killing Worden. Gein testified that after trying to load a bullet into the rifle, it discharged. He said he had not aimed the rifle at Worden, and did not remember anything else that happened that morning.

At the request of the defense, Gein's trial was held without a jury, with Judge Robert H. Gollmar presiding. Gein was found guilty by Gollmar on November 14. A second trial dealt with Gein's sanity; after testimony by doctors for the prosecution and defense, Gollmar ruled Gein "not guilty by reason of insanity" and ordered him committed to Central State Hospital for the Criminally Insane. Gein spent the rest of his life in a mental hospital. Judge Gollmar wrote, "Due to prohibitive costs, Gein was tried for only one murder—that of Mrs. Worden. He also admitted to killing Mary Hogan."

Fate of Gein's property
Gein's house and  property were appraised at $4,700. His possessions were scheduled to be auctioned on March 30, 1958, amidst rumors that the house and the land it stood on might become a tourist attraction. Early on the morning of March 20, the house was destroyed by fire. A deputy fire marshal reported that a garbage fire had been set  from the house by a cleaning crew who were given the task of disposing of refuse, that hot coals were recovered from the spot of the bonfire, but that the fire did not spread along the ground from that location to the house. Arson was suspected, but the cause of the fire was never officially determined. It is possible that the fire was not considered a matter of urgency by fire chief Frank Worden, son of Bernice Worden, Gein's last victim. When Gein learned of the incident while in detention, he shrugged and said, "Just as well."

Gein's 1949 Ford sedan, which he used to haul the bodies of his victims, was sold at public auction for $760 to carnival sideshow operator Bunny Gibbons. Gibbons charged carnival-goers 25¢ admission to see it.

Death

Gein died at the Mendota Mental Health Institute due to respiratory failure secondary to lung cancer on July 26, 1984, at the age of 77. Over the years, souvenir seekers chipped pieces from his gravestone at the Plainfield Cemetery, until the stone itself was stolen in 2000. It was recovered in June 2001, near Seattle, Washington, and was placed in storage at the Waushara County Sheriff's Department. The gravesite itself is now unmarked, but not unknown; Gein is interred between his parents and brother in the cemetery.

In popular culture

Gein's story has had a lasting effect on American popular culture as evident by its numerous appearances in film, music, and literature. The tale first came to widespread public attention in the fictionalized version presented by Robert Bloch in his 1959 suspense novel Psycho. In addition to Alfred Hitchcock's 1960 film of Bloch's novel, Psycho, Gein's story was loosely adapted into numerous films, including Deranged (1974), In the Light of the Moon (2000) (released in the United States and Australia as Ed Gein (2001)), Ed Gein: The Butcher of Plainfield (2007), "Ed Gein, the Musical" (2010), and the Rob Zombie films House of 1000 Corpses and its sequel, The Devil's Rejects. Gein served as the inspiration for myriad fictional serial killers, most notably Norman Bates (Psycho), Leatherface (The Texas Chain Saw Massacre), Buffalo Bill (The Silence of the Lambs) Garland Greene (Con Air), Otis Driftwood from House of 1000 Corpses, Devil's Rejects and 3 from Hell and the character Dr. Oliver Thredson in the TV series American Horror Story: Asylum.

American filmmaker Errol Morris and German filmmaker Werner Herzog attempted unsuccessfully to collaborate on a film project about Gein from 1975 to 1976. Morris interviewed Gein several times and ended up spending almost a year in Plainfield interviewing dozens of locals. The pair planned secretly to exhume Gein's mother from her grave to test a theory, but never followed through on the scheme and eventually ended their collaboration. The aborted project was described in a 1989 New Yorker profile of Morris.

The character Patrick Bateman, in the 1991 novel American Psycho and its 2000 film adaptation, mistakenly attributes a quote by Edmund Kemper to Gein, saying: "You know what Ed Gein said about women? ... He said 'When I see a pretty girl walking down the street, I think two things. One part of me wants to take her out, talk to her, be real nice and sweet and treat her right ... [the other part wonders] what her head would look like on a stick'."

In 2012, German director Jörg Buttgereit wrote and directed a stage play about the case of Gein called Kannibale und Liebe at Theater Dortmund in Germany. The part of Gein was played by actor Uwe Rohbeck.

According to George W. Arndt, news reports at the time of Gein's crimes spawned a subgenre of "black humor", called "Geiners".

In 2022, Ed Gein was featured in an episode of Netflix's Dahmer – Monster: The Jeffrey Dahmer Story'' as a possible inspiration for Jeffrey Dahmer. However, a direct connection between the two is seen as speculation.

See also

 Grave robbery
 Body snatching
 Anatoly Moskvin

General:
 List of homicides in Wisconsin
 List of serial killers in the United States

Notes

References

Bibliography

External links

1906 births
1984 deaths
1957 murders in the United States
20th-century American criminals
American hermits
American male criminals
American people convicted of murder
American people of German descent
American people who died in prison custody
American prisoners sentenced to life imprisonment
Body snatchers
Criminals from Wisconsin
Deaths from respiratory failure
Human trophy collecting
People acquitted by reason of insanity
People convicted of murder by Wisconsin
People from La Crosse County, Wisconsin
People from Plainfield, Wisconsin
People with schizophrenia
Prisoners sentenced to life imprisonment by Wisconsin
Prisoners who died in Wisconsin detention
Suspected serial killers